USS Milius (DDG-69) is an  Aegis guided missile destroyer of the United States Navy. It is the first United States Navy Ship named after a POW/MIA from the Vietnam War.  She is named after Captain Paul L. Milius, a Naval Aviator presumed killed following the crash of his aircraft over Laos in February 1968.  Captain Milius's daughter, Annette, became the sponsor and later christened the ship named in honor of her father.

Service history
In January 2005, Milius participated in Operation Unified Assistance. On 6 December 2006, the ship successfully launched a Block IV Tomahawk cruise missile for the first time in a test of the Block IV configuration. The launch took place in the Naval Air Warfare Center Weapons Division Sea Test Range off of California. The missile flew 869 miles before impacting its target on the land range at China Lake, California.

On 12 September 2007, the Embassy of the United States, Manila stated that the arrival of the destroyers  and USS Milius was a goodwill visit to strengthen Philippines–United States relations.

 

On 23 November 2021, Milius conducted a transit of the Taiwan Strait.

Deployments
 26 May 1998-September 1998 Maiden deployment 
 22 June 2000-December 2000 West Pac-Indian Ocean-Persian Gulf 
 2 November 2002 – 2 June 2003 West Pac-Indian Ocean-Persian Gulf 
 6 December 2004 – 6 June 2005 West Pac-Indian Ocean-Persian Gulf 
 10 April 2007 – 8 October 2007 Scheduled Deployment with BHR ESG 
 December 2008-July 2009 West Pac-Indian Ocean-Persian Gulf 
 18 May 2010 – 16 December 2010 West Pac-Indian Ocean-Persian Gulf 
 11 January 2012 – 11 September 2012 West Pac-Indian Ocean-Persian Gulf 
 20 October 2014 - 25 June 2015 West PAC- Indian Ocean-Persian Gulf 
 May 2018-TBD Forward deployed to 7th Fleet, USS Milius changes homeport from San Diego, CA to Yokosuka, Japan.

Coat of arms 
The ship’s crest is designed in remembrance of the military service of the ship’s namesake, Captain Paul Lloyd Milius, and the courage and dedication that promoted his selfless act of heroism. 

Dark blue and gold are colors traditionally used by the Navy and denote the sea and excellence. The shield itself reflects the power of the Aegis shield. The double-edged battle-ax symbolizes the power of the modern guided missile destroyer. The battle-ax harnesses is a warning that peace should be maintained; provoked and unleashed, the battle-ax is a punishing offensive weapon capable of delivering crushing blows.  The trident reflects the prowess of MILIUS, capable of projecting sea power on the land, in the air, and on and beneath the sea.  The crossed swords are the modern Navy sword of today and the cutlass of the John Paul Jones era symbolizing the enduring tradition and heritage of the United States Navy.  The border, for unity, is red highlighting readiness for action and sacrifice, if necessary.  The seven bolts on the border represent the seven lives saved by Captain Milius’ heroic action. 

The lion suggests Captain Milius’ extraordinary heroism as the aircraft commander in Observation Squadron Sixty-Seven for which he received the Navy Cross, represented by the cross plate, and underscored his selfless courage and inspiring devotion to duty.  

Alii Prae Me, or “Others Before Myself,” was chosen to reflect the personal ethic held throughout Captain Milius’ military career and his selfless act under fire.

Awards
USS Milius has been awarded the Navy Battle "E" four times
 01-Jan-2002 	31-Dec-2002	
 01-Jan-2012   31-Dec-2012 
 01-Jan-2015   31-Dec-2015
 01-Jan-2019   31-Dec-2019
 PACFLT 2003 Retention Excellence Award Winner
 PACFLT 2002 Marjorie Sterrett Battleship Fund Award
 2019 Bloodhound Award Winner
 2019 Spokane Trophy

Ship awards

References

External links

 Official USS Milius Web site
 navsource.org: USS Milius

Arleigh Burke-class destroyers
Destroyers of the United States
Ships built in Pascagoula, Mississippi
1995 ships